This is a list of episodes of the South Korean talk show Radio Star which is currently hosted by Kim Gook-jin, Kim Gura, Ahn Young-mi and Yoo Se-yoon . It airs on MBC every Wednesday at 23:10 (KST) starting May 30, 2007.

2007

2008

2009

2010

2011

2012

2013

2014

2015

2016

2017

2018

2019

2020

2021

2022

2023

References

External links
 

Lists of variety television series episodes
Lists of South Korean television series episodes